The Dražen Petrović Basketball Hall, formerly known as Cibona Sports Centre, is an indoor sports arena located in Zagreb, Croatia. The official seating capacity of the arena is 5,400.

History
The arena was built in 1987, to be used at the 1987 Summer Universiade and was then known as the Cibona Sports Centre. On 4 October 1993, it was renamed after the late former NBA player and basketball Hall of Famer, Dražen Petrović, a former Cibona Zagreb star. On 7 June 2006, on the occasion of the 13th anniversary of the death of Dražen Petrović, a museum-memorial center bearing his name was opened next to the hall. Petrović died in 1993, in a car accident, cutting his great career short.

Events
Cardinal Franjo Kuharić organized the first Christmas in Cibona concert in 1989, and since then it has been held annually. 

Artists that have performed at the hall include: Michael Bolton, Boney M, James Brown, José Carreras, Joe Cocker, Bryan Ferry, Diana Krall, Muse, Nightwish, Pain, Pet Shop Boys, P!nk, Seal and Simple Minds, among others.

See also
 List of indoor arenas in Croatia
 List of indoor arenas in Europe

References

External links

ZagrebInfo.net - Košarkaški centar Dražen Petrović
Dvorana

Basketball venues in Croatia
Indoor arenas in Croatia
Sports venues in Zagreb
Sports venues completed in 1987
Trešnjevka
KK Cibona
1987 establishments in Croatia